Choukri Ouaïl is an Algerian footballer. He is currently unattached, after last playing for JS Kabylie in the Algerian Ligue Professionnelle 1.

Club career
On January 30, 2011, Ouaïl signed a two-year contract with JS Kabylie, joining them on a transfer from JSM Chéraga. The transfer fee was 1 million Algerian dinars. On May 10, 2011, Ouaïl made his debut for the club in a league match against AS Khroub, replacing Nassim Oussalah in the 71st minute. He was released by the club at the end of the season.

References

External links
 

Living people
Algerian footballers
Algerian Ligue Professionnelle 1 players
JS Kabylie players
JSM Chéraga players
Association football midfielders
Year of birth missing (living people)
21st-century Algerian people